Ali Hamadan (also Romanized as Ālī Hamadān, ‘Alī Hamadān, ‘Ālī Hamdān, and Ālīhamdān) is a village in Gol-e Cheydar Rural District, Sarshiv District, Marivan County, Kurdistan Province, Iran. At the 2006 census, its population was 138, in 26 families. The village is populated by Kurds.

References 

Towns and villages in Marivan County
Kurdish settlements in Kurdistan Province